David Swindlehurst (born 6 January 1956 in Edgware, Middlesex) is an English former footballer who played as a striker.

Career
Swindlehurst came up through the ranks at Crystal Palace, playing youth football in the early 1970s with future West Ham United teammate Alan Devonshire. Starting his senior career in 1973, he played for Palace for eight seasons and scored 81 goals in 278 appearances. Swindlehurst first joined Derby County as a loan player, two months before his transfer was made permanent in April 1980. Derby paid £410,000, a then-record for the club.

West Ham manager John Lyall brought Swindlehurst to Upton Park for £160,000 in March 1983. Injuries hampered his chances of regular first-team football. He played his last game for West Ham on 27 April 1985 against Luton Town and after 71 League and cup games for the east Londoners, he moved on to Sunderland.

After a spell in Cyprus with Anorthosis Famagusta, Swindlehurst returned to London to play for Wimbledon, but he managed just two appearances in the season they won the 1988 FA Cup Final, beating Liverpool. He later played for Colchester United, and on loan at Peterborough United.

Coaching career
After spells playing and managing at non-League Bromley and Molesey, he rejoined his former club Crystal Palace to take up a coaching role within the youth academy. He was promoted to reserve team manager in 2001, but was sacked in October 2002.

Swindlehurst joined Crawley Town as assistant manager in 2003. He was sacked in September 2005, and won an unfair dismissal claim against the club the following year. He took the manager's job at Isthmian League Division One South side Whyteleafe in December 2006, and remained there until the end of the following season.

Honours

Club
Crystal Palace
 Football League Second Division Winner (1): 1978–79

References

External links

1956 births
Living people
Footballers from Edgware
English footballers
English expatriate footballers
England under-21 international footballers
English football managers
Association football forwards
Crystal Palace F.C. players
Derby County F.C. players
West Ham United F.C. players
Sunderland A.F.C. players
Anorthosis Famagusta F.C. players
Wimbledon F.C. players
Colchester United F.C. players
Peterborough United F.C. players
English Football League players
Cypriot First Division players
Expatriate footballers in Cyprus
Isthmian League managers
Bromley F.C. managers
Molesey F.C. managers
Whyteleafe F.C. managers
Crystal Palace F.C. non-playing staff
Crawley Town F.C. non-playing staff